John Weekly (June 14, 1937 – November 24, 1974) was an American professional baseball player whose career extended from 1956 through 1965.

He was born in Waterproof in Tensas Parish, Louisiana, but graduated from high school in Pittsburg, California, and attended Diablo Valley College in Pleasant Hill, California. His career began in the New York Giants' organization, but was never called up by the MLB Giants, who moved to Weekly's home San Francisco Bay Area in 1958. Weekly's big-league debut came in the Colt .45s fourth-ever game, on April 13. He grounded out to the second baseman as a pinch hitter off Jack Hamilton of the Philadelphia Phillies in the ninth inning of a 3–2 defeat at Connie Mack Stadium. Six days later, he collected his first MLB hit: a solo home run off the Chicago Cubs' Don Cardwell in a 6-0 Houston triumph at Wrigley Field. Weekly was returned to the Giants' system in mid-May after starting five games in the outfield and 13 total appearances; his five hits included three extra-base blows, among them his second big-league homer (off Pete Richert of the Los Angeles Dodgers) on May 7.

That earned him a promotion to the Colt .45s in midseason for a 34-game stint. Weekly batted .225 with three home runs and 18 hits. His high-water mark came September 18, with three extra base hits in five at bats against the Cincinnati Reds, including two doubles off Cincinnati fireballer Jim Maloney. He drove in four runs and hit his fifth and final big-league homer off the Reds' Dom Zanni.

On June 15, he was traded to the Baltimore Orioles, but logged only nine games for the Orioles' Triple-A affiliate before returning to the Houston organization. After one more full year with the 89ers, in 1965, Weekly left professional baseball. He died from injuries sustained in a road accident in Walnut Creek, California on November 24, 1974.

References

External links

1937 births
1974 deaths
African-American baseball players
Baseball players from Louisiana
Corpus Christi Giants players
Hastings Giants players
Houston Colt .45s players
Major League Baseball outfielders
Muskogee Giants players
Oklahoma City 89ers players
People from Waterproof, Louisiana
Rio Grande Valley Giants players
Road incident deaths in California
Rochester Red Wings players
Salem Senators players
Springfield Giants players
Tacoma Giants players
Victoria Giants players
20th-century African-American sportspeople